Steeton is a civil parish about 6 miles from York, in the Selby district, in the county of North Yorkshire, England. In 2001 the parish had a population of 27. The parish touches Appleton Roebuck, Bilbrough, Bolton Percy, Catterton, Colton, Oxton and Tadcaster.

Landmarks 
There are 4 listed buildings in Steeton.

History 
The name "Steeton" means 'Stub ton', 'Tree-stump farm/settlement'. Steeton was recorded in the Domesday Book as Stiueton/Stiuetone/Stiuetune. Steeton is a deserted medieval village that was thought to have been depopulated except for the Fairfax family by about 1485. The remains of the centre of the village were destroyed in the early 16th century by the construction of a pond. Steeton was formerly a township in the parish of Bolton Percy, in 1866 Steeton became a civil parish in its own right.

References 

 

Civil parishes in North Yorkshire
Selby District
Deserted medieval villages in North Yorkshire